O'Higgins Fútbol Club Reserves and Academy is the reserve and youth team, respectively of Primera División side O'Higgins.

Academy

Youth teams
 Under-18
 Under-17
 Under-16
 Under-15
 Under-14
 Under-13
 Under-12
 Under-11
 Under-10
 Under-9

Football academies in South America